The 78th Tank Division was a division of the Soviet Ground Forces, active from 1965 to the 1990s. It was originally established in 1949 as the 15th Tank Division, from the 78th Heavy Tank Self-Propelled Regiment (the former 78th Tank Brigade). It gained the 78th designation in 1965. It was part of the 1st Army Corps from 1960, and was based at Ayaguz from 1970. Anatoly Kvashnin commanded the division from 1982 to 1987. In 1991, on the fall of the Soviet Union, the 78th Tank Division was serving at Ayaguz, Kazakh SSR, in the Turkestan Military District. In March 1992 it became part of the Kazakh Ground Forces, and soon after became the 78th Mechanized Division.

In 1992 it became a mechanized division. In 2000, it received the honorific "Kabanbai Batyr". In 2003, the division disbanded due to the reorganization of the Kazakh Ground Forces into brigades. The 369th Guards Motor Rifle Regiment became the 3rd Separate Guards Mechanized Brigade. The 180th and 156th Tank Regiments became the 11th Kabanbai Batyr Tank Brigade. The 1030th Self-Propelled Artillery Regiment became the 34th Artillery Brigade.

History 
In the autumn of 1943, the 78th Tank Brigade took part in the Nevel Offensive. One Soviet report said the brigade only lost seven tanks in the offensive. For distinction in battles during this operation, by order of the Supreme Commander-in-Chief on September 7, 1943, the brigade was given the honorary name "Nevelskaya". On April 4, 1944 it was reassigned to the 10th Guards Army of the 2nd Baltic Front.

On February 10, 1945, it was withdrawn from the 10th Guards Army and subordinated to the 42nd Army of the 2nd Baltic Front.

Cold War 
On 23 August 1949, the 78th Heavy Tank Self-Propelled Regiment was upgraded into the 15th Tank Division at Ashgabat, part of the Turkestan Military District. On 23 May 1953, it was reorganized. The 31st Motor Rifle Regiment became the 135th Mechanized Regiment, the 1062nd Artillery Regiment was formed from the mortar regiment and howitzer battalion, the 85th Separate Motorcycle Battalion became a reconnaissance battalion and the chemical defense company was activated. The anti-aircraft artillery regiment was renumbered as the 1144th in April 1955. In June 1957, the division was reorganized again. The 135th Mechanized Regiment became the 374th Motor Rifle Regiment, the 96th Tank Regiment was disbanded and replaced by the 143rd Tank Regiment and the 78th Heavy Tank Self-Propelled Regiment disbanded. In 1960, the separate tank training battalion was disbanded. In October 1960, the division became part of the 1st Army Corps. On 19 February 1962 the 345th Separate Missile Battalion and separate equipment maintenance and recovery battalion were activated.

On 11 January 1965, the division was redesignated as the 78th Tank Division, restoring its original World War II number. In April 1970, the 374th Motor Rifle Regiment moved to the 155th Motor Rifle Division and was replaced  by the 5th Guards Motor Rifle Division's 369th Guards Motor Rifle Regiment. At the same time the division transferred to Ayaguz.  In 1972, the chemical defense company became the 564th Separate Chemical Defense Battalion. The 1052nd Separate Material Supply Battalion was formed in 1980 from the motor transport battalion. On 24 September 1981, the division became part of the 32nd Army. In 1988, the division was equipped with T-62 tanks and BMP-1 infantry fighting vehicles.  On 1 March 1988, it returned to control of the 1st Army Corps. On 4 June 1991 it became part of the reformed 40th Army.During the Cold War it was maintained at 65% strength.

Kazakh service 
In March 1992, it was taken over by Kazakhstan. On 7 May 1992, it officially became part of the Kazakh Ground Forces. On 14 May 1999, the division was reorganized into the 3rd Mechanized Division. The full name of the division after the reorganization was the 3rd Mechanized Red Banner Nevelsk Division. At the same time, the 180th Tank Regiment was renamed to the 31st Tank Regiment. On 20 October 2000, it was named after Kabanbai Batyr. In connection with the transition of the Ground Forces to a brigade formation in 2003, the division was disbanded. On 15 May 2005, the 31st Tank Regiment was reorganized into the 11th Separate Mechanized Brigade. On 1 December 2007, the 11th Mechanized Brigade was reorganized into the 11th Tank Brigade.

References

Tank divisions of the Soviet Union
Military units and formations established in 1965
Military units and formations awarded the Order of the Red Banner